Basic Law: Human Dignity and Liberty is a Basic Law in the State of Israel, enacted to protect the country's main human rights. It enjoys super-legal status, giving the Supreme Court the authority to disqualify any law contradicting it, as well as protection from Emergency Regulations. The view of some Supreme Court judges is that the enactment of this law and of Basic Law: Freedom of Occupation began the Israeli Constitutional Revolution. According to this position, these laws marked a substantial change in the status of human rights in Israel.

This law was enacted in the final days of the 12th Knesset, 17 March 1992. Shortly after it was introduced into Israeli constitutional documents, it became prevalent in human
rights discourse, as well as in freedom of speech cases.

Background
Prior to the enactment of the Basic Law there was little statutory protection of human rights in Israel. These matters were resolved through the development of common law by Supreme Court cases. The Supreme Court in this period, between Israel's founding in 1948 until the Basic Law was enacted in 1992, could not invalidate statutes that disproportionately violated human rights. The judgments of the Supreme Court from this period, "establish[ed] the foundation that human rights are part of Israeli law."

Content of the Basic Law

1 — Purpose
The purpose of this Basic Law is to protect human dignity and liberty, in order to establish in a Basic Law the values of the State of Israel as a Jewish and democratic state.

2 — Preservation of life, body and dignity
There shall be no violation of the life, body or dignity of any person as such.

3 — Protection of property
There shall be no violation of the property of a person.

4 — Protection of life, body and dignity
All persons are entitled to protection of their life, body and dignity.

5 — Personal liberty
There shall be no deprivation or restriction of the liberty of a person by imprisonment, arrest, extradition or otherwise.

6 — Leaving and entering Israel
(a) All persons are free to leave Israel.  (b) Every Israel national has the right of entry into Israel from abroad.

7 — Privacy
(a) All persons have the right to privacy and to intimacy.  (b) There shall be no entry into the private premises of a person who has not consented thereto.  (c) No search shall be conducted on the private premises of a person, nor in the body or personal effects.  (d) There shall be no violation of the confidentiality of conversation, or of the writings or records of a person.

8 — Violation of rights
There shall be no violation of rights under this Basic Law except by a law befitting the values of the State of Israel, enacted for a proper purpose, and to an extent no greater than is required.

9 — Reservation regarding security forces
There shall be no restriction of rights under this Basic Law held by persons serving in the Israel Defence Forces, the Israel Police, the Prisons Service and other security organizations of the State, nor shall such rights be subject to conditions, except by virtue of a law, or by regulation enacted by virtue of a law, and to an extent no greater than is required by the nature and character of the service.

10 — Validity of laws
This Basic Law shall not affect the validity of any law (din) in force prior to the commencement of the Basic Law.

11 — Application
All governmental authorities are bound to respect the rights under this Basic Law.

12 — Stability
This Basic Law cannot be varied, suspended or made subject to conditions by emergency regulations; notwithstanding, when a state of emergency exists, by virtue of a declaration under section 9 of the Law and Administration Ordinance, 5708-1948, emergency regulations may be enacted by virtue of said section to deny or restrict rights under this Basic Law, provided the denial or restriction shall be for a proper purpose and for a period and extent no greater than is required.

Amendment of section 1
(1) Section 1 shall be designated 1(a) and shall be preceded by the following section:

Basic principles
1. Fundamental human rights in Israel are founded upon recognition of the value of the human being, the sanctity of human life, and the principle that all persons are free; these rights shall be upheld in the spirit of the principles set forth in the Declaration of the Establishment of the State of Israel.
(2) At the end of section 8, the following shall be added:
"or by regulation enacted by virtue of express authorization in such law."

However, several cardinal human rights are missing from this document, such as the Freedom of Religion, Right for Equality, Freedom of Protest, Freedom of Speech (the last two are 
recognized by the Supreme Court as "belonging to the freedoms that characterize Israel as a democratic state") and others. These rights were given to the residents of Israel by general legal principles and Supreme Court rulings which existed before this Basic Law. Although these rights were not included in this law, some jurists, such as former Chief Justice of The Supreme Court of Israel Aharon Barak, see these rights are directly derived from the "right to dignity".

Guarantee of super-legal status
Due to these rights' great importance, the Knesset chose to give this law a super-legal status, protected by several means.

Section 8 of this law asserts that "There shall be no violation of rights under this Basic Law except by a law befitting the values of the State of Israel, enacted for a proper purpose, and to an extent no greater than is required, or by regulation enacted by virtue of express authorization in such law." (sentence in italics added in a 1994 amendment to the law).
This clause became known as "limiting paragraph", as it limits and restricts the Knesset in legislating laws contradicting this law.

Section 12 defends the law from the Emergency Regulations, stating that the government cannot change this Basic Law, and thus cannot weaken the rights it protects, by the emergency regulations it can enact. As written: "This Basic Law cannot be varied, suspended or made subject to conditions by emergency regulations;". However, when a State of Emergency is in place, regulations can be enacted that restrict these rights: "notwithstanding, when a state of emergency exists, by virtue of a declaration under section 9 of the Law and Administration Ordinance, 5708-1948, emergency regulations may be enacted by virtue of said section to deny or restrict rights under this Basic Law, provided the denial or restriction shall be for a proper purpose and for a period and extent no greater than is required." Thus, the protection from Emergency Regulations is up to the government and Supreme Court's judgement.

References

External links

Government of Israel
Human rights in Israel
Politics of Israel
Human Dignity
National human rights instruments
1992 in Israel
1992 in law
12th Knesset (1988–1992)